Fonyód–Alsóbélatelep is a resort near to Fonyód, in Somogy county, Hungary. The settlement is located on the southern side of Lake Balaton, opposite to the Hill of Badacsony.

External links 
 Map of the village 

Populated places in Somogy County